Ariamnes makue is a species of spider in the family Theridiidae. They are endemic to the island of Oahu in the Hawaiian Islands. The name derives from the Hawaiian word "māku'e," meaning "dark in color."

References

Theridiidae
Spiders of Hawaii
Spiders described in 2007